Anna Sophia Polak (27 April 1874, Rotterdam — 26 February 1943) was a Jewish feminist and author. She was the director of the National Bureau of Women’s Labor from 1908 to 1936. She was murdered in Auschwitz concentration camp.

References

1874 births
1943 deaths
Dutch people who died in Auschwitz concentration camp
Dutch civilians killed in World War II
Dutch feminists
Dutch women writers
Jewish feminists
Jewish women writers
Writers from Rotterdam
Dutch Jews who died in the Holocaust
Jewish Dutch writers
20th-century Dutch women